Pavel Vasilyevich Bagryantsev (born 14 March 1986) is a former Russian former football midfielder.

References

External links
 Career summary by sportbox.ru
 
 

1986 births
Living people
Russian footballers
Association football midfielders
FC SKVICH Minsk players
FC Tekstilshchik Ivanovo players
Belarusian Premier League players
Russian expatriate footballers
Expatriate footballers in Belarus